Gong Tae-ha  (born 9 May 1987) is a South Korean footballer who plays for team, Daejeon Citizen.

External links 

1987 births
Living people
South Korean footballers
Jeonnam Dragons players
Daejeon Hana Citizen FC players
K League 1 players
Gong Tae-ha
Gong Tae-ha
South Korean expatriate footballers
South Korean expatriate sportspeople in Thailand
Expatriate footballers in Thailand
Association football forwards